Leonard Fryer may refer to:
 Leonard Fryer (16th-century artist) (died 1605?), English artist
 Leonard Fryer (designer) (1891–1965), British artist and designer